George Demetrius Katinakis (25 July 1873 – 15 May 1943) was an English first-class cricketer. Katinakis was a right-handed batsman.

Katinakis made his first-class debut for Hampshire in 1904. Katinakis represented the club in the 1906 County Championship, playing in three matches, the last of which came against Somerset.

Katinakis died in Southwold, Suffolk on 15 May 1943.

External links
George Katinakis at Cricinfo
George Katinakis at CricketArchive

1873 births
1943 deaths
Cricketers from Greater London
English cricketers
Hampshire cricketers
British people of Greek descent